Chelonistele sulphurea is a species of orchid that grows along the Malay Peninsula, Borneo, Sumatra, Java, and Philippines. The plant blooms small, fragrant flowers.

Varieties
Two varieties are recognized:

Chelonistele sulphurea var. crassifolia (Carr) de Vogel - Sabah
Chelonistele sulphurea var. sulphurea  - Borneo, Java, Malaysia, Sumatra, Philippines

References

External links 

 The Internet Orchid Species Photo Encyclopedia

Orchids of Java
Orchids of Sumatra
Orchids of Malaya
Orchids of Borneo
Orchids of the Philippines
sulphurea